Brad Murphey (born December 27, 1955, in Tucson, Arizona), is a former American racecar driver in the Indy Racing League.  He raced in the 1996 and 1996-1997 seasons for Hemelgarn Racing with 3 career starts, including the Indianapolis 500 where he was credited with 23rd place, but never finished a race or led a lap.  His last IRL race was the inaugural 500K at Las Vegas Motor Speedway where his right leg/pelvis was broken while involved in an accident with Eddie Cheever and Stephane Gregoire on lap 29.

He also has prior experience in Indy Lights, Trans-Am Series, Formula Super Vee, Formula Ford, and HotRod racing. In 1984 he attempted to qualify for the CART races at Mid Ohio and Las Vegas, but failed to do so.

Despite many websites stating that he is Australian, Murphey was born and raised in Arizona and has in fact never been to Australia. He believes the misconception was due to the fact that most of his race crew during his entire career was from Australia or New Zealand and that the phenomena of him being incorrectly identified as Australian predates the internet.

American Open Wheel racing

CART IndyCar
(key)

Indy Lights 

(key)

IRL IndyCar Series
(key)

Trivia
He is often referred to as "Bronco" Brad Murphey, as he is a former bronco riding champion.

References

External links
Brad Murphey IndyCar stats

1955 births
Indianapolis 500 drivers
Indy Lights drivers
SCCA Formula Super Vee drivers
IndyCar Series drivers
Living people
Sportspeople from Tucson, Arizona
Racing drivers from Arizona
Racing drivers from Tucson, Arizona
Trans-Am Series drivers